Grant Sherfield (born October 29, 1999) is an American college basketball player for the Oklahoma Sooners of the Big 12 Conference. He previously played for the Wichita State Shockers and the Nevada Wolf Pack.

High school career
Sherfield attended North Crowley High School in Fort Worth, Texas. As a junior, he averaged 24.1 points, 4.2 assists and 3.6 rebounds per game, earning District 4-6A co-MVP and Offensive Player of the Year. For his senior season, Sherfield transferred to Sunrise Christian Academy in Bel Aire, Kansas. He averaged a team-high 15.6 points and led the program to its first GEICO Nationals appearance. He originally committed to playing college basketball for UCLA but reopened his recruitment after head coach Steve Alford was fired. Sherfield later committed to Wichita State over offers from Minnesota and Wake Forest, among others.

College career
On December 29, 2019, Sherfield recorded a freshman season-high 15 points and 11 rebounds in an 84–66 win over Abilene Christian. As a freshman, he averaged 8.1 points and 2.9 assists per game, shooting 35 percent from the field. Sherfield transferred to Nevada and was granted a waiver for immediate eligibility. He averaged 18.6 points, 6.1 assists, 3.7 rebounds and 1.6 steals per game as a sophomore. Sherfield was named to the First Team All-Mountain West as well as Mountain West Newcomer of the Year. On November 23, 2021, he scored a career-high 31 points and had six assists in an 88–69 win over George Mason. As a junior, he averaged 19.1 points, 6.4 assists and 4.2 rebounds per game. Sherfield was named to the Third Team All-Mountain West as a junior. On April 7, 2022, he declared for the 2022 NBA draft while maintaining his college eligibility. On April 15, he entered the transfer portal. On May 24, 2022, Sherfield announced he was withdrawing from NBA draft and transferring to Oklahoma for his senior season.

Career statistics

College

|-
| style="text-align:left;"| 2019–20
| style="text-align:left;"| Wichita State
| 30 || 12 || 25.1 || .353 || .304 || .744 || 3.0 || 2.9 || .8 || .1 || 8.1
|-
| style="text-align:left;"| 2020–21
| style="text-align:left;"| Nevada
| 26 || 26 || 34.7 || .433 || .367 || .855 || 3.7 || 6.1 || 1.6 || .0 || 18.6
|-
| style="text-align:left;"| 2021–22
| style="text-align:left;"| Nevada
| 28 || 28 || 35.7 || .435 || .333 || .871 || 4.2 || 6.4 || .6 || .0 || 19.1
|- class="sortbottom"
| style="text-align:center;" colspan="2"| Career
| 84 || 66 || 31.6 || .417 || .339 || .834 || 3.6 || 5.0 || 1.0 || .0 || 15.0

References

External links
Nevada Wolf Pack bio
Wichita State Shockers bio

1999 births
Living people
American men's basketball players
Basketball players from Wichita, Kansas
Nevada Wolf Pack men's basketball players
Wichita State Shockers men's basketball players
Point guards